We Sing 80s is a 2012 karaoke game part of the We Sing family of games, developed by French studio Le Cortex.  The game features songs from the 1980s only.

Gameplay
The gameplay is similar to the SingStar set of video games. Players are required to sing along with music in order to score points, matching pitch and rhythm. The game has anticheat technology whereby tapping or humming will register on the screen but no points will be awarded. We Sing Pop! also contains the addition of 'Star Notes' that allow the player to score even more points by matching the pitch and rhythm of certain hard to score parts of songs.

 30 full licensed songs with music videos where available
 Solo Modes - Solo, Blind and Expert.
 Multiplayer modes - Group Battle, We Sing, Versus, Pass the Mic, First to X, Expert, Blind, Marathon.
 Real Karaoke mode
 Jukebox mode
 Singing Lessons
 Award System
 Customisable backgrounds
 Four Microphones
 Integrates with a USB hub

Due to hardware limitations with the Wii only having two USB ports, a standard USB hub can be used to play with three or more players. The game uses the standard logitech USB microphone for the Wii.

Track list

The tracklist for We Sing 80s was announced over a set number of weeks. The final full tracklist for the international version of the game was announced on 18 September 2012
 
 Baltimora - Tarzan Boy
 The Bangles - Eternal Flame
 Blondie - The Tide is High
 Cameo - Word Up!
 Culture Club - Do You Really Want To Hurt Me
 Cyndi Lauper - True Colors
 DeBarge - Rhythm of the Night
 Dexys Midnight Runners - Come On Eileen
 Duran Duran - Rio
 Frankie Goes to Hollywood - The Power of Love
 The Human League - Don't You Want Me
 Kylie Minogue - I Should Be So Lucky
 Lionel Richie - All Night Long (All Night)
 Lisa Stansfield - All Around The World
 Musical Youth - Pass the Dutchie
 Paula Abdul - Straight Up
 Queen - I Want to Break Free
 Roxette - The Look
 Sabrina - Boys (Summertime Love)
 Sade - Smooth Operator
 Simple Minds - Alive & Kicking
 Smokey Robinson - Being with You
 Spandau Ballet - True
 Starship - Nothing's Gonna Stop Us Now
 Tears for Fears - Shout
 Tiffany - I Think We're Alone Now
 Toto - Africa
 T'Pau - China in Your Hand
 Yazoo - Only You
 Yazz and the Plastic Population - The Only Way Is Up

Peripherals

Due to hardware limitations with the Wii only having two USB ports, any standard USB hub can be used to increase the number of USB ports to allow for four players. The game uses the standard Logitech USB microphone for the Wii.

See also
We Sing
We Sing Encore
SingStar
Karaoke Revolution
Lips

References

External links 
We Sing Website

2012 video games
Karaoke video games
Music video games
THQ Nordic games
We Sing
Video games developed in France
Wii games
Wii-only games
Wired Productions games
Multiplayer and single-player video games